Melanchrous is a genus of beetles in the family Carabidae, containing the following species:

 Melanchrous africanus (Straneo, 1940) 
 Melanchrous celisi Straneo, 1962 
 Melanchrous flavipes (Motschulsky, 1866) 
 Melanchrous florens (Andrewes, 1929) 
 Melanchrous obesus (Andrewes, 1938) 
 Melanchrous schoutedeni (Straneo, 1943)

References

Licininae